The Men's 1985 European Amateur Boxing Championships were held in Budapest, Hungary from May 25 to June 2; 1985. The 26th edition of the bi-annual competition was organised by the European governing body for amateur boxing, EABA. There were 142 fighters from across many European countries participated in the competition.

Medal winners

Medal table

External links
Results
Amateur Boxing

European Amateur Boxing Championships
Boxing
European Amateur Boxing Championships
International boxing competitions hosted by Hungary
European Amateur Boxing Championships
European Amateur Boxing Championships
European Amateur Boxing Championships, 1985
International sports competitions in Budapest